The flavescent flycatcher (Myiophobus flavicans) is a species of bird in the family Tyrannidae.  Its name comes from flavescent, a yellowish colour. It is found in Colombia, Ecuador, Peru, and Venezuela.  Its natural habitat is subtropical or tropical moist montane forests.

References

flavescent flycatcher
Birds of the Northern Andes
flavescent flycatcher
flavescent flycatcher
Taxonomy articles created by Polbot